Suad Liçi (born 24 March 1974 in Shkoder) is an Albanian football midfielder who last played for KS Vllaznia Shkoder in 2008–2009 season in the Albanian Superliga before retiring.

Club career
He has previously played for KF Tirana and FK Baku in Azerbaijan. Suad Lici has wear the Red and Blue shirt for KS Vllaznia over 290 games and scored 46. He won two Albanian Superliga in 1997–1998, 2000–2001 and also the same years as he won the league trophies he won two Albanian Supercup too in 1997–1998, 2000–2001. His last trophy he won was with KS Vllaznia the Albanian Cup in 2007–2008 against one of his previous club KF Tirana. His overall record in Albanian Superliga is 358 games and scored 56 times and won 11 trophies. Also Suad Lici played in Azerbaijan which he manage to win the Yuksak Liqa in 2005–2006 season.

International career
He made his debut for Albania in a February 2000 Malta Tournament match against Andorra and earned a total of 6 caps, scoring no goals. His final international was a May 2005 friendly match against Poland.

National team statistics

Honours
 Winner of the Albanian Superliga 1997–1998 with Vllaznia Shkoder
 Winner of the Albanian Supercup 1997–1998 with Vllaznia Shkoder
 Winner of the Albanian Superliga 2000–2001 with Vllaznia Shkoder
 Winner of the Albanian Supercup 2000–2001 with Vllaznia Shkoder
 Winner of the Albanian Cup 1999–2000 with Teuta Durrës
 Winner of the Albanian Superliga 2002–2003 with KF Tirana
 Winner of the Albanian Supercup 2002–2003 with KF Tirana
 Winner of the Albanian Superliga 2003–2004 with KF Tirana
 Winner of the Albanian Supercup 2003–2004 with KF Tirana
 Winner of the Albanian Superliga 2004–2005 with KF Tirana
 Winner of the Yuksak Liqa 2005–2006 with FK Baku
 Winner of the Albanian Cup 2007–2008 with Vllaznia Shkoder

References

1974 births
Living people
Footballers from Shkodër
Albanian footballers
Association football defenders
Albania international footballers
KF Vllaznia Shkodër players
KF Teuta Durrës players
Luftëtari Gjirokastër players
KF Tirana players
FC Baku players
Albanian expatriate footballers
Expatriate footballers in Azerbaijan
Albanian expatriate sportspeople in Azerbaijan
Kategoria Superiore players